Jabal Al-Fil (Elephant Mountain) is a rock formation in Saudi Arabia.

Standing 117 ft high, it is located 11 km northeast of Al-'Ula.

See also
Elephant Rock - a list of other rocks/formations that resemble elephants

References

Rock formations of Saudi Arabia